Lyudmyla Viktorivna Kichenok (born 20 July 1992) is a Ukrainian professional tennis player. On 27 February 2023, she peaked at No. 8 in the doubles WTA rankings. Kichenok has won eight doubles titles on the WTA Tour, including four with her twin sister Nadiia. On 21 July 2014, Lyudmyla reached her career-high singles ranking of world No. 156.

Career

2015: First WTA doubles title and singles top-10 win
In 2015, she won her first WTA doubles title together with her sister. They escaped a 5–0 deficit in the second set tie-break of their 6–4, 7–6 defeat of Liang Chen and Wang Yafan in the Shenzhen Open final. That made the Kichenoks the second pair of twins, after Karolína Plíšková and Kristýna Plíšková, to win a WTA doubles title. They previously had been runners-up at Tashkent in 2011 and Shenzhen in 2014. She won the second WTA doubles title at Brasil Tennis Cup.

During the Tianjin Open, Lyudmyla caused the biggest upset of the tournament with a top-10 win, over world No. 8 and reigning US Open champion, Flavia Pennetta, in the first round for the biggest win of her career so far.

2022: Two major semifinals, WTA 1000 title, World No. 9 & WTA Finals debut
At the Dubai Tennis Championships, she made the final in doubles, partnering Jelena Ostapenko but they were defeated by second seeds Veronika Kudermetova and Elise Mertens.

At the French Open, she reached the semifinals of a major for the first time in her career partnering again with Ostapenko, falling to the eventual champions Caroline Garcia and Kristina Mladenovic. She reached the top 20 in doubles on 6 June 2022.
The following week, she won her sixth title at Birmingham with Ostapenko. At the Wimbledon Championships, she again reached the semifinals with Ostapenko, again falling to the eventual champions Barbora Krejčíková and Kateřina Siniaková.

At the Cincinnati Open, she reached the final with Ostapenko defeating Australian Open finalists Haddad Maia and Anna Danilina and top seeds Kudermetova and Mertens. The pair won their biggest title defeating Nicole Melichar and Ellen Perez. Kichenok reached a new career-high in doubles of world No. 10 on 22 August 2022 and No. 9 on 12 September 2022.

At the inaugural edition of the Tallinn Open, seeded third with her sister Nadia, she won her eighth title defeating top seeds Nicole Melichar/Laura Siegemund in the final.

She qualified for the 2022 WTA Finals with Jelena Ostapenko where they reached the semifinals.

Performance timelines

Only main-draw results in WTA Tour, Grand Slam tournaments, Fed Cup/Billie Jean King Cup and Olympic Games are included in win–loss records.

Doubles

Significant finals

WTA 1000

Doubles: 1 (title)

WTA Elite Trophy

Doubles: 2 (2 titles)

WTA career finals

Doubles: 17 (8 titles, 9 runner-ups)

ITF Circuit finals

Singles: 12 (6 titles, 6 runner–ups)

Doubles: 51 (28 titles, 23 runner–ups)

Top 10 wins

Notes

References

External links
 
 
 

1992 births
Living people
Ukrainian female tennis players
Sportspeople from Dnipro
Ukrainian twins
Twin sportspeople
Tennis players at the 2016 Summer Olympics
Olympic tennis players of Ukraine
Tennis players at the 2020 Summer Olympics